ORCATS (Operational Research Computerised Allocation of Tickets to Services) is a large centralised legacy computer system used on passenger railways in Great Britain. It is used for real time reservation  and revenue sharing on interavailable tickets between train operating companies (TOCs). The system is used to divide ticket revenue when a ticket or journey involves trains operated by multiple TOCs. The system was owned by British Rail, and is now managed by the Rail Delivery Group.

History
Before nationalisation, a similar function was carried out by the Railway Clearing House.

References

Centralized computing
Information technology organisations based in the United Kingdom
Legacy systems
Passenger rail transport in the United Kingdom
Public transport information systems